Tom Dennison may refer to:
 Tom Dennison (political boss) (1859–1934), political boss in Omaha, Nebraska in the early 1900s
 Tom Dennison (One Life to Live),  character from the soap opera One Life to Live